Cosmosoma sectinota is a moth of the subfamily Arctiinae. It was described by George Hampson in 1898. It is found in Mexico.

References

sectinota
Moths described in 1898